Titus Johnson is a Pakistani politician who was elected member for the Provincial Assembly of Balochistan.

Political career
He was elected to Provincial Assembly of Balochistan on a reserved seat for minorities in 2018 Pakistani general election representing Balochistan National Party (Mengal)

References

Living people
Politicians from Balochistan, Pakistan
Balochistan National Party (Mengal) MPAs (Balochistan)
Year of birth missing (living people)